Menecrates is the name of:

 Menecrates of Ephesus, ancient Greek poet
 Menecrates of Syracuse, physician to Philip of Macedon
 Menecrates of Tralles, Greek physician during the 1st century BC 
 Menecrates (sculptor), ancient Greek sculptor
 Menecrates, ancient Greek writer who wrote the history of the city of Nicaea
 Tomb of Menecrates, an archaic tomb in Corfu.
 A pirate in William Shakespeare's play Antony and Cleopatra